Tale of Tales BVBA is a Belgian developer of art games founded in 2003 by Auriea Harvey and Michaël Samyn, who had been working together in the creation of Web sites and electronic art as Entropy8Zuper! since 1999. In an interview by Nightmare Mode, Michael Samyn explained their motivations to create interactive art and disappointment at the lack of evolution in interaction of games.

They live close to the Saint Bavo Cathedral, which they consider one of their greatest influences. The studio is named after Giambattista Basile's book The Tale of Tales (Lo Cunto de li cunti), with their main series being retellings of fairy tales in the form of adventure games, each subtitled "a Tale of Tales" and linked together by a common character referred to as the Deaf-Mute Girl in a Pretty White Dress in the 8 Web site and as the Girl in White in The Path'''s user manual. It was hinted in an interview with ZillionMonkey that their next project, following The Path, will involve the character of Salome and be developed using the Unity authoring tool, which they had first trailed with The Graveyard as a side-project during development of The Path.

February 2010 saw the release of Vanitas, described as "a memento mori for your digital hands," their first work for the iPhone OS platform and their first with music by Zoë Keating. On 1 March 2010 it was announced that they were commencing the development of two large projects, alternating between the two of them for the next 18 months (i.e. until September 2011).

Despite a successful Kickstarter campaign, the commercial failure of their game Sunset caused Tale of Tales to announce that they would no longer pursue commercial video game projects.

As of late 2022, their intended remake of Endless Forest, powered by Unreal Engine 4, is near completion, currently in its earliest beta stage. 

Projects

Main series8 (2002–2009, on hiatus), based on "Sun, Moon, and Talia" and other variants of the "Sleeping Beauty" mythThe Path (2009), based on "Little Red Riding Hood," originally titled 144Sunset (2015)
"A Day in San Bavón" (2014)

Other games
Het Min en Meer Spel (The Less and More Game, 2005), for an album by Gerry De Mol and Eva De RoovereThe Endless Forest (2005—, ongoing)The Kiss: Incorporator (2007), commissioned by the Museum of Modern Art, AntwerpThe Graveyard (2008)Fatale (2009)Vanitas (2010), commissioned for the Art History of Games symposium and exhibition by the Savannah College of Art and Design and the Georgia Institute of Technology Program in Digital MediaBientôt l'été ("Almost Summer", 2012), based on the work of Marguerite Duras and other French literatureLuxuria Superbia (2013) Game for the Android tablets, iPad, Linux, OS X, Ouya and Windows. It won the Nuovo Award at the 2014 Independent Games Festival.LOCK (2016), part of the Triennale Game CollectionScreensaversPoussière sidérale (2003), screensaver based on particle systems designed for 8Vernanimalcula, screensaver for the National Bank of Belgium

As Entropy8Zuper! (selected)Eden.Garden (2001), commissioned by the San Francisco Museum of Modern ArtWirefire (1999–2003)Al-Jahiz (2000), commissioned by Lifetime TelevisionB-O-X (2002)Sixteenpages.net (2000) (1999), first exhibited at Hell.comThe Godlove Museum'' (1999–2006)

References

External links
 Tale of Tales website
 Entropy8Zuper! website
 "The Making of Fatale", by Bruno de Figueiredo (20-12-09)

Belgian artist groups and collectives
Video game companies established in 2002
Video game development companies
Video game companies of Belgium
2002 establishments in Belgium
Companies based in East Flanders